The Bungalow was an institution for Aboriginal children established in 1914 in Alice Springs in the Northern Territory of Australia. It existed at several locations in Alice Springs (then called Stuart), Jay Creek and the Alice Springs Telegraph Station.

Background

From 1911 the Commonwealth Government gained control of the Northern Territory from South Australia. It then came under the jurisdiction of the Department of External Affairs. In July 1913, Senior Constable Robert Stott in Stuart (now Alice Springs) wrote to the Secretary of the Department of External Affairs Atlee Hunt describing the need for a government school in the town. In January 1914, the Administrator of the Northern Territory, J.A. Gilruth, visited Stuart. He also stated his belief that the government should provide a school, noting that "there would be eleven school-age white children, four quadroons and some half caste children" who should receive some sort of education. He proposed the erection of a teacher's residence with classroom attached.

In March 1914, Stott telegraphed Gilruth advising that a building where he kept rations for Aboriginal people could be converted temporarily into a classroom. On the same day Gilruth advised that arrangements were being made with the South Australian Director of Education to procure a teacher. The first teacher was Ida Standley, who departed for Stuart from Adelaide, South Australia, on 6 May 1914. Her salary was £150 per annum. The school opened in June with 25 students. Standley taught the white children for four-and-a-half hours each morning at the police station. After lunch, 14 "half-caste" children joined her class for one-and-a-half hours. Standley sometimes provided evening classes to "half-caste" adults at The Bungalow.

Overnight these "half-caste" children were cared for by Topsy Smith, an Arabana woman who had recently arrived in Stuart, following the death of her husband Bill Smith, a miner working in Arltunga. Smith and seven of her eleven "half-caste" children, were given a tent by Stott, who informed the Administrator that there was no other accommodation for her family. He suggested that two township allotments near the Police Station, and behind the Stuart Arms Hotel, should be reserved for the use "half-castes". The Administrator agreed to this, and authorised the building of an iron shed and Topsy Smith was placed in charge of it under the supervision of Sergeant Stott and, by November 1914, she was caring for 16 children. This number continued to grow rapidly with light-skinned children being picked up from Aboriginal camps and placed there. Also in 1914, Standley agreed to accept the position of matron with an extra remuneration of £50 per annum, and they began working together.

This became known as The Bungalow although it is unclear who came up with that name or exactly when and, although it conjures up a homely image, the place "soon degenerated to a wretched hovel". Living conditions behind the Stuart Arms Hotel were far from ideal and, despite the great effort of both Topsy Smith and Ida Standley, to keep the place clean and the children clothed. Food was limited and the children would often hang around the Stuart Arms Hotel looking for scraps. Additionally toilet and washing facilities were primitive and there were few proper beds with the residents huddling together on the floor in winter and camping outdoors, and under the trees, in summer.

The Bungalow remained in the hotel's "backyard" until 1928 when they were moved out to Jay Creek

Jay Creek

As the number of children living at The Bungalow grew to over 60 and there were increasing concerns over conditions there, and, in June 1925 the Secretary of the Aborigines Friends Association John H. Sexton stated "the environment of the Bungalow for half caste children is not conducive to their best interests". An additional concern was what would happen to the girls living at The Bungalow with the influx of construction workers to Stuart working on the approaching railway line.

However, ultimately the plan was rushed as government officials were concerned what would happen to the girls living at The Bungalow with the influx of construction workers to Stuart working on the approaching railway line. So, in November 1928, Topsy Smith and Ida Standely, both of whom had wanted to leave, moved to Jay Creek with the Bungalow children (26 boys and 19 girls made the move) and living conditions there were just as poor as they were in town.

During this period, between 1928 and 1929, the home was supervised by Ernest Eugene Kramer; alongside his wife Euphemia.

By 1932, the institution had "water problems" and a new site was proposed at the Alice Springs Telegraph Station.

Alice Springs Telegraph Station

The site had been vacated by the telegraph staff in the months before and significant alterations were made to the buildings and genuine effort was put in to making it comfortable with, amongst other additions, a large corrugated-iron dormitory was built with rows of double bunks where girls slept in the eastern wings and boys in the western and, for the first time, flushing toilets were available.

Emily Liddle (née Perkins), who was 11 when she moved to the new location said: "When we came here, Telegraph, we were shocked to see beds and mattresses. Coming into a mansion after sleeping on concrete floors. We were shocked really... We rushed around and they said, oh, they even got a shower and bathtubs."

However, the new site was soon overcrowded, and it appeared that not enough resources were made available; this was particularly apparent after 33 boys were moved from Pine Creek.

In 1934 the Superintendent of The Bungalow, Gordon Keith Freeman, who had been appointed in 1930, was arrested for the rape of a 16-year-old girl in the dormitories late at night. This girl bravely wrote a letter to the Deputy Administrator Victor Carrington to report the rape and begun her letter with the words "I am longing to have someone help me". Carrington took immediate action and took sworn statements from other girls at The Bungalow and from staff and sadly found that it had not been an isolated incident and, in the subsequent trial, the accuser and five of her fellow Bungalow residents gave damning evidence against him; additional evidence was given by Hetty Perkins. Freeman was found guilty, dismissed from his position, and fined £100, but being unable to pay was instead sentenced for three months. Many people did not think this was a suitable punishment with some believing it was too light and many that it was too harsh and, ultimately, he served only 30 days of the sentence.

The Bungalow closed in 1942 when children were evacuated south in response to World War II. The majority of the children from the institution were sent south to Mulgoa in New South Wales and Balaklava in South Australia. Following this the army transformed the buildings into a labour camp for Aboriginal workers during World War II.

The Bungalow reopened in 1945 as an Aboriginal reserve for adult workers, eventually closing in 1960.

Notable people

Residents

Edith Espie, jockey and community leader
Topsy Glynn, and her two daughters
Freda Glynn, co-founder of CAAMA
Rona Glynn, first Indigenous teacher and nurse in Alice Springs
Alec Kruger, activist
Herbie Laughton, country music singer
Gloria Ouida Lee, a Chinese Australian miner
Bob Randall, elder, singer and community leader
Alec Ross, tour guide

Staff 
 Hetty Perkins
 Topsy Smith
 Ida Standley

See also
Stolen Generations

References

External links 
 The birthplace and history of Alice Springs
 Bringing them Home Report (1997) 

Child-related organisations in Australia
Public schools in the Northern Territory